Mike van Duivenbode (born 4 January 1999) is a Dutch professional darts player who plays in the Professional Darts Corporation (PDC) events.

Career
In 2017 he won two Development Tour events, in which he beat Dimitri Van den Bergh 5-3 and Adam Hunt 5–0 in the respective finals.

He won a PDC Tour Card at the second day of the 2019 European Q-School by beating Madars Razma 5–4 in the final, which coincidentally came on his 20th birthday.

References

External links

1999 births
Living people
Dutch darts players
Professional Darts Corporation former tour card holders
Sportspeople from Dordrecht
21st-century Dutch people